The 2020 United States House of Representatives election in the Northern Mariana Islands was held on Tuesday, November 3, 2020, to elect the territory's Delegate to the United States House of Representatives in the 117th United States Congress. The Delegate, who is elected to a two-year term, represents the Northern Mariana Islands' at-large congressional district in the U.S. House of Representatives.

The election coincided with the larger 2020 United States House of Representatives elections and the 2020 Northern Mariana Islands general election.

Incumbent Rep. Gregorio Sablan, an independent who caucuses with the Democratic Party, was unopposed in seeking re-election.

Race background
Gregorio "Kilili" Sablan was first elected in 2008, becoming the first delegate to the United States House of Representatives in the history of the Northern Mariana Islands. He has held the seat since its creation.  More recently, Sablan also ran unopposed in 2016 election. In 2018, Sablan defeated Republican Angel Demapan with approximately 64% of the vote in the November election.

Rep. Gregorio Sablan filed to run for re-election on August 3, 2020, at the Commonwealth Election Commission office on Saipan. He was the only candidate to contest the 2020 race.

Candidates

Independent 
Gregorio Sablan, incumbent Delegate for Northern Mariana Islands' at-large congressional district since January 2009

General election
Sablan, who ran unopposed, won the November 2020 election.

References

Northern Mariana Islands
2020
House